Albert Winkler may refer to:

 Alberto Winkler (1932–1981), Italian rower
 Albert J. Winkler (1894–1989), American professor of viticulture 
 Albert Winkler (entomologist) (1881–1945), Austrian entomologist